Ajay Singh Sangha (born 6 June 1992) is an English former first-class cricketer.

Sangha was born at Windsor in June 1992. He was educated at Eton College, before going up to Durham University. While studying at Durham, he played two first-class cricket matches for Durham MCCU against Middlesex and Durham in 2012. He scored 63 runs in his two matches, with a high score of 32. With his off break bowling he took 3 wickets, with best figures of 1 for 36.

References

External links

1992 births
Living people
People from Windsor, Berkshire
People educated at Eton College
Alumni of Durham University
English cricketers
Durham MCCU cricketers
British Asian cricketers
British sportspeople of Indian descent
British people of Punjabi descent